ED50 ("European Datum 1950", EPSG:4230) is a geodetic datum which was defined after World War II for the international connection of geodetic networks.

Background

Some of the important battles of World War II were fought on the borders of Germany, the Netherlands, Belgium and France, and the mapping of these countries had incompatible latitude and longitude positioning. During the war the German Military Survey (Reichsamt Kriegskarten und Vermessungswesen), under the command of Lieutenant General Gerlach Hemmerich, began a systematic mapping of the areas under the control of the German Military, a large part of Europe. The allies were also concerned about the state of mapping in Europe, and in 1944 the US Army Map Service set up an intelligence team to collect mapping and surveying information from the Germans as the allied armies moved through Europe after the Normandy landings. The group, known as Houghteam after Major Floyd W. Hough, collected much material. Their greatest success was in April 1945. They found a large cache of material in Saalfeld, Thuringia, which proved to be the entire geodetic archives of the German Army. The shipment, 75 truckloads in all, was transferred to Bamberg, and then to Washington for evaluation. 

Shortly after this, the team captured the personnel of the Reichsamt für Landesaufnahme, the State Surveying Service, in Friedrichroda, also in Thuringia. This group had been working on the integration of the mapping of the occupied territories with that of Germany, under Professor Erwin Gigas, a geodesist with an international reputation. They were directed to continue this work, in Bamberg in the US zone of occupation, as part of the US-led effort to develop a single adjusted triangulation for Central Europe. This was completed in 1947. The work was then extended to cover much of Western Europe which was completed in 1950, and became ED50.

The European triangulation was originally classified military information. It was de-classifired in the 1960s, and became the basis for the definition of international boundaries in the North Sea. It was, and still is, used in much of Western Europe apart from Great Britain, Ireland, Sweden and Switzerland, which have their own datums.

It used the International Ellipsoid of 1924 ("Hayford-Ellipsoid" of 1909) (radius of the Earth's equator 6378.388 km, flattening 1/297, both exact). That spheroid was an early attempt to model the whole Earth and was widely used around the world until the 1980s when GRS 80 and WGS 84 were established.

Many national coordinate systems of Gauss–Krüger are defined by ED50 and oriented by means of geodetic astronomy. Up to now it has been used in databases of gravity fields, cadastre, small surveying networks in Europe and America, and by some developing countries with no modern baselines. ED50 was also part of the fundamentals of the NATO coordinates (Gauss–Krüger and UTM) up to the 1980s.

The geodetic datum of ED50 was centred at the Helmertturm on the Telegrafenberg in Potsdam, (then East) Germany; the intent was to encourage cooperation with the socialist states during the cold war, which failed. The adjustments for later versions of the datum (ED77, ED79) used the Munich Frauenkirche as starting point.

Datum shift between ED50 and WGS 84

The longitude and latitude lines on the two datums are the same in the Archangel region of north-west Russia. As one moves westwards across Europe, the longitude lines on ED50 gradually become further west than their WGS 84 equivalents, and are around 100 metres west in Spain and Portugal. Moving southwards, the latitude lines on ED50 gradually become further south than the WGS 84 lines, and are around 100 m south in the Mediterranean Sea. 

This means that if the lines are further west, the longitude value of any given point becomes more easterly. Similarly, if the lines are south, the values become northerly. This is due to the fact that the International Ellipsoid is larger than the GRS 80/WGS 84 ellipsoid, so a given north-south distance will cover more latitude on the new ellipsoid, and a given east-west distance will cover more longitude.

The datum shift for the Universal Transverse Mercator grid is different. The eastings vary between 0 m in Eastern Europe and 100 m in the far west of the continent, roughly similar to the longitude shift, but the northings are about 200 m different across Europe, with the ED50 UTM northing lines south of the WGS 84 UTM northing lines. UTM northings are measured from the Equator; distance from the equator to latitude 50 degrees is 112 m more on the International than on the WGS 84 spheroid.

References

See also

 The French datum RGF93
 The Great Britain datum OSGB36.
 For Ireland, the Irish Transverse Mercator.
 The Swedish datum RT90.
 The Switzerland datum CH1903.

Geodesy
Geographic coordinate systems